Diego Ignacio García Medina (born 19 December 1996 in Chañaral, Chile) is a Chilean footballer who currently plays for Chilean club Deportes Copiapó as a defender.

External links
 

1996 births
Living people
Chilean footballers
Chilean Primera División players
A.C. Barnechea footballers
Universidad de Chile footballers
Rangers de Talca footballers
Deportes Copiapó footballers
Association football central defenders
People from Chañaral